The 2008-09 Biathlon World Cup/World Cup 4 has been held in Oberhof, Germany. From Wednesday January 7 until Sunday January 11, 2009.

Schedule of events
The provisional schedule of the event is below.

Medal winners

Men

Women

References

Biathlon World Cup - World Cup 4, 2008-09
Biathlon competitions in Germany
Sport in Oberhof, Germany
2009 in German sport
Sport in Thuringia
January 2009 sports events in Europe
2000s in Thuringia